Muhammad Bin Tughlaq: Tale of a Tyrant is a historical fiction written by Indian author, Anuja Chandramouli and published by Penguin Random House in 2019.

About 
The book's genre is historical fiction and it is written by Anuja Chandramouli. This is her 10th book in seven years. It was published by Penguin Random House and it has 223 pages.

Reception 
The book was listed under "20 most talked about Indian books" by Times of India.  Deccan Herald also listed book in "Book Rack". Urmi Chanda-Vaz, writing for scroll.in, noted that book is "gory story" and considered it as "formulaic and shallow".

References 

2019 Indian novels
Indian historical novels in English